Platte Township is a rural civil township of Benzie County in the U.S. state of Michigan. Its population was 343 at the 2020 census. It is located in the north central portion of the county.

Geography

Major highway 

  runs north–south through the west of the township. However, it exits the township to the west. For its entire length, M-22 parallels the coast of Lake Michigan.

Demographics
As of the census of 2000, there were 342 people, 151 households, and 109 families residing in the township.  The population density was 9.4 per square mile (3.6/km).  There were 242 housing units at an average density of 6.7 per square mile (2.6/km).  The racial makeup of the township was 97.08% White, 1.17% Native American, 0.29% from other races, and 1.46% from two or more races. Hispanic or Latino of any race were 1.17% of the population.

There were 151 households, out of which 23.8% had children under the age of 18 living with them, 60.9% were married couples living together, 6.0% had a female householder with no husband present, and 27.8% were non-families. 24.5% of all households were made up of individuals, and 7.3% had someone living alone who was 65 years of age or older.  The average household size was 2.26 and the average family size was 2.66.

In the township the population was spread out, with 20.5% under the age of 18, 3.8% from 18 to 24, 27.5% from 25 to 44, 34.2% from 45 to 64, and 14.0% who were 65 years of age or older.  The median age was 44 years. For every 100 females, there were 111.1 males.  For every 100 females age 18 and over, there were 119.4 males.

The median income for a household in the township was $36,979, and the median income for a family was $38,250. Males had a median income of $23,333 versus $18,333 for females. The per capita income for the township was $18,499.  About 5.5% of families and 6.1% of the population were below the poverty line, including 10.7% of those under age 18 and none of those age 65 or over.

References

Townships in Benzie County, Michigan
Traverse City micropolitan area
Townships in Michigan